Bohdan Volodymyrovych Shukhman (born 8 April 2000) is a Ukrainian professional footballer who plays as a goalkeeper.

Career

Early years
Shukhman is a product of several sports schools from around Kyiv.

Inhulets Petrove
He made his professional debut on 1 May 2019 for a brief period of time in a home game against PFC Sumy that was struggling that season. Shukhman was listed as a substitute goalkeeper for Inhulets for since the 2018–19 Ukrainian First League season and also was on the roster for the 2019 Ukrainian Cup Final.

External links 
 
 
 
 

2000 births
Living people
Ukrainian footballers
Association football goalkeepers
FC Inhulets Petrove players
FC Inhulets-2 Petrove players
FC Podillya Khmelnytskyi players
Ukrainian First League players
Ukrainian Second League players
Sportspeople from Kyiv Oblast